The House at 52 Oak Street in Wakefield, Massachusetts is one of the most elaborate Colonial Revival houses in the Greenwood section of town.  The -story wood-frame house was built in the 1890s.  It has significant Queen Anne styling, including a turret and wraparound porch, but porch details such as the multiple columns on paneled piers are Colonial Revival in style, as are the hip-roof dormers.  The house was built by Henry Savage, a developer with ultimately unsuccessful plans to develop the Greenwood area residentially in the 1880s.

The house was listed on the National Register of Historic Places in 1989.

See also
National Register of Historic Places listings in Wakefield, Massachusetts
National Register of Historic Places listings in Middlesex County, Massachusetts

References

Houses on the National Register of Historic Places in Wakefield, Massachusetts
Colonial Revival architecture in Massachusetts
Houses completed in 1890
Houses in Wakefield, Massachusetts